Mahogany is a straight-grained, reddish-brown timber of three tropical hardwood species of the genus Swietenia, indigenous to the Americas and part of the pantropical chinaberry family, Meliaceae. Mahogany is used commercially for a wide variety of goods, due to its coloring and durable nature. It is naturally found within the Americas, but has also been imported to plantations across Asia and Oceania. The mahogany trade may have begun as early as the 16th century and flourished in the 17th and 18th centuries. In certain countries, mahogany is considered an invasive species.

Description
The three species are: 
Honduran or big-leaf mahogany (Swietenia macrophylla), with a range from Mexico to southern Amazonia in Brazil, the most widespread species of mahogany and the only genuine mahogany species commercially grown today. Illegal logging of S. macrophylla, and its highly destructive environmental effects, led to the species' placement in 2003 on Appendix II of Convention on International Trade in Endangered Species (CITES), the first time that a high-volume, high-value tree was listed on Appendix II.
West Indian or Cuban mahogany (Swietenia mahagoni), native to southern Florida and the Caribbean, formerly dominant in the mahogany trade, but not in widespread commercial use since World War II. 
Swietenia humilis, a small and often twisted mahogany tree limited to seasonally dry forests in Pacific Central America that is of limited commercial utility. Some botanists believe that S. humilis is a mere variant of S. macrophylla.

While only the three Swietenia species are classified officially as "genuine mahogany", other Meliaceae species with timber uses are classified as "true mahogany". Some may or may not have the word mahogany in their trade or common name. Some of these true mahoganies include the African genera Khaya (African mahogany) and Entandrophragma (sapele mahogany); New Zealand mahogany or kohekohe (Dysoxylum spectabile); Chinese mahogany, Toona sinensis; Indonesian mahogany, Toona sureni; Indian mahogany, Toona ciliata; Chinaberry, Melia azedarach; Pink Mahogany (or Bosse), Guarea; Chittagong (also known as Indian Mahogany), Chukrasia velutina; and Crabwood Carapa guianensis. Some members of the genus Shorea (Meranti, Balau, or Lauan) of the family Dipterocarpaceae are also sometimes sold as Philippine mahogany, although the name is more properly applied to another species of Toona, Toona calantas.

Mahogany is a commercially important lumber prized for its beauty, durability, and color, and used for paneling and to make furniture, boats, musical instruments and other items. The leading importer of mahogany is the United States, followed by Britain; while the largest exporter today is Peru, which surpassed Brazil after that country banned mahogany exports in 2001. It is estimated that some 80 or 90 percent of Peruvian mahogany exported to the United States is illegally harvested, with the economic cost of illegal logging in Peru placed conservatively at $40–70 million USD annually. It was estimated that in 2000, some 57,000 mahogany trees were harvested to supply the U.S. furniture trade alone.

Mahogany is the national tree of the Dominican Republic and Belize. A mahogany tree with two woodcutters bearing an axe and a paddle also appears on the Belizean national coat of arms, under the national motto, Latin for "under the shade I flourish."

The specific density of mahogany is 0.55. Mahogany, African: (500–850 kg/m3); Mahogany, Cuban: 660 kg/m3; Mahogany, Honduras: 650 kg/m3; Mahogany, Spanish: 850 kg/m3.

Overview

Distribution
The natural distribution of these species within the Americas is geographically distinct. S. mahagoni grows on the West Indian islands as far north as the Bahamas, the Florida Keys and parts of Florida; S. humilis grows in the dry regions of the Pacific coast of Central America from south-western Mexico to Costa Rica; S. macrophylla grows in Central America from Yucatan southwards and into South America, extending as far as Peru, Bolivia and extreme western Brazil. In the 20th century various botanists attempted to further define S. macrophylla in South America as a new species, such as S. candollei Pittier and S. tessmannii Harms., but many authorities consider these spurious. According to Record and Hess, all of the mahogany of continental North and South America can be considered as one botanical species, Swietenia macrophylla King.

Both major species of Swietenia were introduced in several countries outside of the Americas during the 1800s and early 1900s using seeds from South America and the Caribbean. Many of these plantings became naturalized forests over time. 

India had both S. macrophylla and S. mahagoni introduced in 1865 using seeds from West Indies. Both eventually became naturalized forests. Bangladesh had Honduran S. macrophylla introduced in 1872 and as with India it became naturalized in some areas. S. mahagoni and S. macrophylla were introduced in Indonesia in 1870 using seeds from India. S. macrophylla was included in plantation forests planted in Indonesia from the 1920s to the 1940s. Philippines had S. macrophylla introduced in 1907 and in 1913 as well as S. mahagoni in 1911, 1913, 1914, 1920 and 1922. Planting resumed in the late 1980s. It was planted with many other exotic tree species for the purpose of reforestation. S. macrophylla was planted in Sri Lanka in 1897 but it was left unmanaged until the 1950s when reforestation efforts initiated by the Sri Lankan government led to plantations being consciously developed. In the early 1900s S. mahagoni was planted on the islands of O'ahu and Maui in Hawaii but was neglected and became naturalized forests. Additionally, S. macrophylla was planted in 1922 on O'ahu and is now naturalized. Fiji had S. macrophylla introduced originally in 1911 as an ornamental species using seeds from Honduras and Belize. Fiji has become a major producer of mahogany in the 21st Century due to a robust plantation program spanning over 50 years. Harvesting began in 2003.

History
The name mahogany was initially associated only with those islands in the West Indies under British control (French colonists used the term acajou, while in the Spanish territories it was called caoba). The origin of the name is uncertain, but it could be a corruption of 'm'oganwo', the name used by the Yoruba and Ibo people of West Africa to describe trees of the genus Khaya, which is closely related to Swietenia. When transported to Jamaica as slaves, they gave the same name to the similar trees they saw there. Though this interpretation has been disputed, no one has suggested a more plausible origin. The indigenous Arawak name for the tree is not known. In 1671 the word mahogany appeared in print for the first time, in John Ogilby's America. Among botanists and naturalists, however, the tree was considered a type of cedar, and in 1759 was classified by Carl Linnaeus (1707–1778) as Cedrela mahagoni. The following year it was assigned to a new genus by Nicholas Joseph Jacquin (1727–1817), and named Swietenia mahagoni.

Until the 19th century all of the mahogany was regarded as one species, although varying in quality and character according to soil and climate. In 1836 the German botanist Joseph Gerhard Zuccarini (1797–1848) identified a second species while working on specimens collected on the Pacific coast of Mexico, and named it Swietenia humilis. In 1886 a third species, Swietenia macrophylla, was named by Sir George King (1840–1909) after studying specimens of Honduras mahogany planted in the Botanic Gardens in Calcutta, India. 

Today, all species of Swietenia grown in their native locations are listed by CITES, and are therefore protected. After S. mahogani and S. macrophylla were added to CITES appendixes in 1992 and 1995 respectively international conservation programs began in earnest aided by a 1993 World Bank report entitled “Tropical Hardwood Marketing Strategies for Southeast Asia“. Efforts to repopulate mahogany largely failed in its native locations due to attacks from the shoot borer Hypsipyla grandella and similarly failed in Africa due to the attacks by the equivalent Hypsipyla robusta. After so many years of mismanagement and illegal logging, Swietenia also suffered from genetic loss thus mutating and weakening the seeds. Additionally erosion in its native locations meant seeds could no longer even be planted. However, both species grew well in Asia and Asia Pacific due to the absence of these shoot borers and absence of other limitations. Plantation management progressed throughout the 1990s and 2000s in Asia and the South Pacific. Global supply of genuine mahogany has been increasing from these plantations, notably Fiji, and Philippines. For Swietenia macrophylla, the trees in these plantations are still relatively young compared to the trees being harvested from old growth forests in South America. Thus, the illegal trade of bigleaf mahogany continues apace.

Species
Species of Swietenia cross-breed readily when they grow in proximity; the hybrid between S. mahagoni and S. macrophylla is widely planted for its timber.

In addition, the U.S. timber trade also markets various other Federal Trade Commission–defined species as mahoganies under a variety of different commercial names, most notably Philippine mahogany, which is actually from the genus Shorea, a dipterocarp. This wood is also called Lauan or Meranti.

History of American mahogany trade

In the 17th century, the buccaneer John Esquemeling recorded the use of mahogany or cedrela on Hispaniola for making canoes: "The Indians make these canoes without the use of any iron instruments, by only burning the trees at the bottom near the root, and afterwards governing the fire with such industry that nothing is burnt more than what they would have..."

The wood first came to the notice of Europeans with the beginning of Spanish colonisation in the Americas. A cross in the Cathedral at Santo Domingo, bearing the date 1514, is said to be mahogany, and Philip II of Spain apparently used the wood for the interior joinery of the palace El Escorial, begun in 1584. However, caoba, as the Spanish called the wood, was principally reserved for shipbuilding, and it was declared a royal monopoly at Havana in 1622. Hence very little of the mahogany growing in Spanish controlled territory found its way to Europe.

After the French established a colony in Saint Domingue (now Haiti), some mahogany from that island probably found its way to France, where joiners in the port cities of Saint-Malo, Nantes, La Rochelle and Bordeaux used the wood to a limited extent from about 1700. On the English-controlled islands, especially Jamaica and the Bahamas, mahogany was abundant but not exported in any quantity before 1700.

18th century
While the trade in mahogany from the Spanish and French territories in America remained moribund for most of the 18th century, this was not true for those islands under British control. In 1721 the British Parliament removed all import duties from timber imported into Britain from British possessions in the Americas. This immediately stimulated the trade in West Indian timbers including, most importantly, mahogany. Importations of mahogany into England (and excluding those to Scotland, which were recorded separately) reached 525 tons per annum by 1740, 3,688 tons by 1750, and more than 30,000 tons in 1788, the peak year of the 18th century trade.

At the same time, the 1721 Act had the effect of substantially increasing exports of mahogany from the West Indies to the British colonies in North America. Although initially regarded as a joinery wood, mahogany rapidly became the timber of choice for makers of high quality furniture in both the British Isles and the 13 colonies of North America.

Until the 1760s over 90 per cent of the mahogany imported into Britain came from Jamaica. Some of this was re-exported to continental Europe, but most was used by British furniture makers. Quantities of Jamaican mahogany also went to the North American colonies, but most of the wood used in American furniture came from the Bahamas. This was sometimes called Providence wood, after the main port of the islands, but more often madera or maderah, which was the Bahamian name for mahogany.

In addition to Jamaica and Bahamas, all the British controlled islands exported some mahogany at various times, but the quantities were not large. The most significant third source was Black River and adjacent areas on the Mosquito Coast (now Republic of Honduras), from where quantities of mahogany were shipped from the 1740s onwards. This mahogany was known as 'Rattan mahogany', after the island of Ruatan, which was the main offshore entrepot for the British settlers in the area.

At the end of the Seven Years' War (1756–63), the mahogany trade began to change significantly. During the occupation of Havana by British forces between August 1762 and July 1763, quantities of Cuban or Havanna mahogany were sent to Britain, and after the city was restored to Spain in 1763, Cuba continued to export small quantities, mostly to ports on the north coast of Jamaica, from where it went to Britain. However, this mahogany was regarded as inferior to the Jamaican variety, and the trade remained sporadic until the 19th century.

Another variety new to the market was Hispaniola mahogany, also called 'Spanish' and 'St Domingo' mahogany. This was the result of the 1766 Free Ports Act, which opened Kingston and other designated Jamaican ports to foreign vessels for the first time. The object was primarily to encourage importations of cotton from French plantations in Saint Domingue, but quantities of high quality mahogany were also shipped. These were then forwarded to Britain, where they entered the market in the late 1760s.

In terms of quantity, the most significant new addition to the mahogany trade was Honduras mahogany, also called 'baywood', after the Bay of Honduras. British settlers had been active in southern Yucatan since the beginning of the 18th century, despite the opposition of the Spanish, who claimed sovereignty over all of Central America.

Their main occupation was cutting logwood, a dyewood in high demand in Europe. The center of their activity and the primary point of export was Belize. Under Article XVII of the Treaty of Paris (1763), British cutters were for the first time given the right to cut logwood in Yucatan unmolested, within agreed limits. Such was the enthusiasm of the cutters that within a few years the European market was glutted, and the price of logwood collapsed.

However, the price of mahogany was still high after the war, and so the cutters turned to cutting mahogany. The first Honduras mahogany arrived in Kingston, Jamaica, in November 1763, and the first shipments arrived in Britain the following year.

By the 1790s most of the viable stocks of mahogany in Jamaica had been cut, and the market was divided between two principal sources or types of mahogany. Honduras mahogany was relatively cheap, plentiful, but rarely of the best quality. Hispaniola (also called Spanish or Santo Domingo) mahogany was the wood of choice for high quality work.

Data are lacking, but it is likely that the newly independent United States now received a good proportion of its mahogany from Cuba. In the last quarter of the 18th century France began to use mahogany more widely; they had ample supplies of high quality wood from Saint Domingue. The rest of Europe, where the wood was increasingly fashionable, obtained most of their wood from Britain.

Recent history
The French Revolution of 1789 and the wars that followed radically changed the mahogany trade, primarily due to the progressive collapse of the French and Spanish colonial empires, which allowed British traders into areas previously closed to them. Saint Domingue became the independent republic of Haiti, and from 1808, Spanish controlled Santo Domingo and Cuba were both open to British vessels for the first time.

From the 1820s mahogany from all these areas was imported into Europe and North America, with the lion's share going to Britain. In Central America British loggers moved northwest towards Mexico and south into Guatemala. Other areas of Central America as far south as Panama also began to be exploited.

The most important new development was the beginning of large scale logging in Mexico from the 1860s. Most mahogany was cut in the province of Tabasco and exported from a number of ports on the Gulf of Campeche, from Vera Cruz eastwards to Campeche and Sisal. By the end of the 19th century there was scarcely any part of Central America within reach of the coast untouched by logging, and activity also extended into Colombia, Venezuela, Peru and Brazil.

Trade in American mahogany probably reached a peak in the last quarter of the 19th century. Figures are not available for all countries, but Britain alone imported more than 80,000 tons in 1875. This figure was not matched again. From the 1880s, African mahogany (Khaya spp.), a related genus, began to be exported in increasing quantities from West Africa, and by the early 20th century it dominated the market.

In 1907 the total of mahogany from all sources imported into Europe was 159,830 tons, of which 121,743 tons were from West Africa. By this time mahogany from Cuba, Haiti and other West Indian sources had become increasingly difficult to obtain in commercial sizes, and by the late 20th century Central American and even South American mahogany was heading in a similar direction. In 1975 S. humilis was placed on CITES Appendix II (a list of species that would be in danger of extinction without strict regulation) followed by S. mahagoni in 1992. The most abundant species, S. macrophylla, was placed on Appendix III in 1995 and moved to Appendix II in 2003.

Uses

Mahogany has a straight, fine, and even grain, and is relatively free of voids and pockets. Its reddish-brown color darkens over time, and displays a reddish sheen when polished. It has excellent workability, and is very durable.  Historically, the tree's girth allowed for wide boards from traditional mahogany species.  These properties make it a favorable wood for crafting cabinets and furniture.

Much of the first-quality furniture made in the American colonies from the mid 18th century was made of mahogany, when the wood first became available to American craftsmen. Mahogany is still widely used for fine furniture; however, the rarity of Cuban mahogany, the over-harvesting of Honduras and Brazilian mahogany, and the protests by indigenous peoples and environmental organizations from the 1980s into the 2000s, have diminished their use. Recent mahogany production from Mexico and Fiji has a lighter color and density than South American production from the early 20th century.

Mahogany also resists wood rot, making it attractive in boat construction and outdoor decking. It is a tonewood, often used for musical instruments, particularly the backs, sides and necks of acoustic guitars, electric guitar bodies, and drum shells because of its ability to produce a very deep, warm tone compared to other commonly used woods, such as maple, alder, ash (Fraxinus) or spruce. Guitars featuring mahogany in their construction include select Martin Guitars such as the D-18, select Taylor Guitars, select Gibson Guitars such as the Les Paul, SG and J45 and select Hagström guitars. In the 1930s Gibson used the wood to make banjo necks as well, the RB, TB and PB style 3s and RB, TB and PB style 75s were most commonly fitted with mahogany necks.

Mahogany as an invasive species

In the Philippines, environmentalists are calling for an end to the planting of mahogany because of its negative impact on the environment and wildlife, including possibly causing soil acidification and no net benefit to wildlife.

References

Antiques
Furniture
Wood
Swietenia
History of forestry
Forestry in Central America
Forestry in Asia
Plant common names